Robert L. Wilson House is a historic home located at Noblesville, Hamilton County, Indiana.  The oldest section is dated to the late-1860s, and is a two-story, Italianate style brick dwelling.  It consists of four sections and was likely constructed in three parts, taking its present form by 1898. The house features three two-level cast iron porches.

It was listed on the National Register of Historic Places in 2008.

References

Houses on the National Register of Historic Places in Indiana
Italianate architecture in Indiana
Houses completed in 1898
Buildings and structures in Hamilton County, Indiana
National Register of Historic Places in Hamilton County, Indiana